Aio (supposedly died 974) was a fabricated English monk of Crowland Abbey in Lincolnshire and historian. The Oxford Dictionary of National Biography strongly suggests he never existed.

References

Attribution

Fictional historians
Fictional Christian monks
Fictional English people